Married may refer to:

Common uses
 Marital status, the state of being married (or otherwise legally partnered) or unmarried (divorced, widowed, or single and never married)
 Marriage, union of individuals that creates kinship
 Married pair, a set of two railroad cars or locomotives which are permanently coupled and treated as if they were a single unit, also called a twin unit

Arts, entertainment, and media
 Married (radio series), BBC radio comedy with science fiction themes
 Married (TV series), American television series on FX
 "Married", a 1991 episode of Get a Life (TV series)

See also
Common-law marriage
Just Married (disambiguation)
The Wedding (disambiguation)
Wedding (disambiguation)